
Year 87 BC was a year of the pre-Julian Roman calendar. At the time it was known as the Year of the Consulship of Octavius and Cinna/Merula (or, less frequently, year 667 Ab urbe condita) and the Second Year of Houyuan. The denomination 87 BC for this year has been used since the early medieval period, when the Anno Domini calendar era became the prevalent method in Europe for naming years.

Events 
 By place 

 Roman Republic 
 Lucius Cornelius Cinna is elected consul of Rome, thus returning the rule of Rome back to the populares faction.
 Sulla arrives in Greece and besieges Athens. He orders Lucius Licinius Lucullus to raise a fleet from Rome's allies around the eastern Mediterranean.
 Ostia is razed by Gaius Marius as he comes back from Africa with an army to take Rome by force.

 China 
 March 29 – Emperor Wu of Han dies after a 54-year reign in which he leads the Han dynasty (China) through its greatest expansion. The Empire's borders span from modern Kyrgyzstan in the west, to Mongolia in the north, to Korea in the east, and to northern Vietnam in the south.
 March 30 – The eight-year-old Liu Fuling becomes emperor, with Huo Guang General-in-Chief and regent.

 By topic 

 Technology 
 Antikythera mechanism manufactured.

Births 
 Lucius Munatius Plancus, Roman consul (approximate date)

Deaths 
 March 29 – Han Wudi, emperor of the Han dynasty (b. 157 BC)
 Apollodorus of Artemita, Greek writer
 Gaius Atilius Serranus, Roman consul and senator 
 Gaius Julius Caesar Strabo, Roman politician
 Gnaeus Pompeius Strabo, Roman general and politician
 Gotarzes I, ruler (shah) of the Parthian Empire
 Lucius Cornelius Merula, Roman politician and priest 
 Lucius Julius Caesar, Roman consul (killed by partisans of Gaius Marius)
 Marcus Antonius, Roman consul (executed by order of Marius and Cinna)
 Publius Licinius Crassus, Roman consul and censor (killed by Marians invading Rome)
 Quintus Ancharius, Roman politician (executed by order of Marius and Cinna)

References